St. Albert (formally styled Saint Albert from 1905 to 1909) is a provincial electoral district in Alberta, Canada. The district is one of 87 current districts mandated to return a single member to the Legislative Assembly of Alberta.

The riding encompasses the majority, but not all of, the bedroom community of St. Albert.

History
The St. Albert electoral district was one of the original 25 electoral districts contested in the 1905 Alberta general election upon Alberta joining Confederation in September 1905. The district was carried over from the old St. Albert electoral district which returned a single member to the Legislative Assembly of the Northwest Territories from 1891 to 1905. The district stretched from the City of St. Albert west to the British Columbia border. The riding was renamed in 1909 and has shrunk in size many times since, eventually becoming an urban riding.

Although the other district that survives from 1905 (Peace River) is a notable bellwether, St. Albert is a notorious swing riding that has been markedly unkind to its incumbent MLAs. New candidates from an incumbent party have only held the district twice after an incumbent MLA left office, and only two MLAs have managed to win a third term.

Boundary history

Historically, the riding has included the City of St. Albert and rural areas to the north and west. In Alberta's first election in 1905, the riding stretched to the border with British Columbia.

As the city grew in population, the riding shrank to include less rural voters. By 1993, the boundaries of the riding matched the city boundaries. From 1997 onwards, the riding has not included all of the city of St. Albert.

The 2010 boundary redistribution kept the riding boundaries exactly the same as the 2003 boundary redistribution. The 2017 redistribution saw its boundaries shift slightly to the west.

Representation history

The electoral district was created in 1905 when the province was founded. The first elected held that year saw hotly contested race between Liberal candidate Lucien Boudreau and Independent Liberal Henry McKenney. The race was very close with McKenney winning by just eight votes. Despite being elected as an Independent McKenney was a supporter of the Rutherford government and caucused with the Liberals.

McKenney only stayed in the St. Albert district for a single term. He decided to run in the Pembina electoral district in the 1909 election. Boudreau ran again that year and won a hotly contested race over future MLA's Wilfrid Gariépy and Omer St. Germain. He was re-elected in 1913 and 1917 facing Conservative candidate Hector Landry both times and winning with comfortable majorities.

Boudreau ran for a fourth term in the 1921 election. He was defeated by United Farmers candidate Telesphore St. Arnaud. Boudreau would run again in the 1926 election as St. Arnaud only sat in office for a single term. He would win a hotly contested race in vote transfers to retake the district. Boudreau would be removed from office on November 18, 1926 after a court convicted Boudreau of bribery and corruption. Boudreau appealed and was re-instated on December 8, 1926.

The 1930 general election would see Omer St. Germain run in a straight fight against Boudreau in a rematch of the 1909 election. St. Germain won with a comfortable majority to retake the seat for the United Farmers.

St. Germain crossed the floor to the Liberals on February 6, 1934. He would run for a second term in office in a hotly contested race against four other candidates in the 1935 election. He would finish third on the first ballot and would end up being defeated by Social Credit candidate Charles Holder in vote transfers. Holder would only last one term in office. He ran in the 1940 general election but was defeated by Independent candidate Lionel Tellier.

Tellier did not run again in the 1944 general election. Charles Holder made a comeback and regained the seat for Social Credit. Holder retired from politics in 1948. Social Credit incumbent Lucien Maynard moved to St. Albert from the Beaver River electoral district and won to hold the seat for his party. He won a second term in the 1952 election.

The 1955 election was won by Liberal candidate Arthur Soetaert defeating Maynard. He would only last a term having been defeated in the 1959 general election by Social Credit candidate Keith Everitt. The 1963 and 1967 elections saw Everitt hold the district. He would be defeated in the 1971 general election by Progressive Conservative candidate Ernest Jamison.

Jamison held the electoral district for a second term in the 1975 general election. He was defeated running for the Progressive Conservative nomination in 1979 by Myrna Fyfe who went on to hold the seat in the 1979 general election for her party.

Fyfe ran for re-election in 1982 and won the largest majority in the history of the district. She ran for a third term in the 1986 general election but was defeated by NDP candidate Bryan Strong in a hotly contested race.

Strong only stayed in office for a single term choosing not to run again in the 1989 general election. Progressive Conservative Dick Fowler picked up the seat for his party. Fowler ran for a second term in the 1993 election but was defeated by Liberal candidate Len Bracko.

Bracko himself would only last a single term in office as he was defeated in the 1997 general election by Progressive Conservative candidate Mary O'Neill in the closest race of the election winning by just 16 votes. O'Neill would win a second term in the 2001 general election.

The 2004 general election would see Liberal candidate Jack Flaherty regain the seat for the Liberals as Mary O'Neill went down to defeat. Flaherty only lasted a single term in office as the riding swung back into the Progressive Conservative column when candidate Ken Allred won a strong majority.

Legislature results

1905 general election

1909 general election

The 1909 general election saw incumbent Henry McKenney run for re-election in the new electoral district of Pembina as the boundaries of the St. Albert electoral district were significantly changed in the 1909 boundary redistribution.

A meeting was held on March 1, 1909 in Morinville to hear from candidates interested in the nomination for the provincial Liberals. The meeting was very well attended with over 400 delegates. The three candidates were Mayor of St. Albert Lucien Boudreau who was the runner up in the 1905 election as well as Omer St. Germain a farmer from Morinville and Wilfrid Gariépy an Alderman in Edmonton.

Gariépy was presented with a petition of over 500 electors in the constituency of St. Albert requesting him to be the Liberal candidate. The names on the petition added up to two thirds of the voter list in the constituency at the time and made a nomination convention unnecessary. He accepted the request and after a two-hour speech declared his candidacy as a straight supporter of the Rutherford government.

At the meeting Boudreau said he was determined to be nominated by convention and St. Germain said he would probably be a candidate. A nominating convention was called on March 6, 1909 and once again held in the town of Morinville. This meeting was only attended by 54 delegates.

Gariépy had pressing business to attend in Edmonton the day of the convention and had asked two representatives to speak on his behalf, they told the convention delegates that Gariépy would not allow his name to go before the convention and that he would choose to contest the election independently of it. St. Germain told the convention that if they chose Boudreau he would retire from the race in his favor. Boudreau was acclaimed by the convention.

The provincial Conservatives had nominated Lucien Dubuc who had run in the previous election in the Peace River electoral district. He was nominated without a convention. He dropped out of the race before the nomination deadline. St. Germain joined the race late as another Independent Liberal candidate after Dubuc retired. By the end of the campaign all three candidates in the race were Rutherford supporters and running as straight Liberals.

Lucien Boudreau won the race taking over half the popular vote on election night, while Gariépy finished a strong second but failed to win the votes of all those that signed the petition for his candidacy. St. Germain finished a distant third.

1913 general election

1917 general election

1921 general election

1926 general election

1930 general election

1935 general election

1940 general election

1944 general election

1948 general election

1952 general election

1955 general election

1959 general election

1963 general election

1967 general election

1971 general election

1975 general election

1979 general election

1982 general election

1986 general election

1989 general election

1993 general election

1997 general election

2001 general election

2004 general election

2008 general election

2012 general election

2015 general election

2019 general election

Senate nominee results

2004 Senate nominee election district results
Voters had the option of selecting 4 Candidates on the Ballot

2012 Senate nominee election district results

Plebiscite results

1948 Electrification Plebiscite
District results from the first province wide plebiscite on electricity regulation.

1957 liquor plebiscite

On October 30, 1957 a stand-alone plebiscite was held province wide in all 50 of the then current provincial electoral districts in Alberta. The government decided to consult Alberta voters to decide on liquor sales and mixed drinking after a divisive debate in the Legislature. The plebiscite was intended to deal with the growing demand for reforming antiquated liquor control laws.

The plebiscite was conducted in two parts. Question A asked in all districts, asked the voters if the sale of liquor should be expanded in Alberta, while Question B asked in a handful of districts within the corporate limits of Calgary and Edmonton asked if men and woman were allowed to drink together in establishments.

Province wide Question A of the plebiscite passed in 33 of the 50 districts while Question B passed in all five districts. St. Albert voted in favour of the proposal by a landslide majority. Voter turnout in the district was almost equal to the province wide average of 46%.

Official district returns were released to the public on December 31, 1957. The Social Credit government in power at the time did not considered the results binding. However the results of the vote led the government to repeal all existing liquor legislation and introduce an entirely new Liquor Act.

Municipal districts lying inside electoral districts that voted against the Plebiscite were designated Local Option Zones by the Alberta Liquor Control Board and considered effective dry zones, business owners that wanted a license had to petition for a binding municipal plebiscite in order to be granted a license.

Student Vote results

2004 election

On November 19, 2004 a Student Vote was conducted at participating Alberta schools to parallel the 2004 Alberta general election results. The vote was designed to educate students and simulate the electoral process for persons who have not yet reached the legal majority. The vote was conducted in 80 of the 83 provincial electoral districts with students voting for actual election candidates. Schools with a large student body that reside in another electoral district had the option to vote for candidates outside of the electoral district then where they were physically located.

2012 election

References

External links 
Riding Map for St. Albert
Demographics for St. Albert
Website of the Legislative Assembly of Alberta

Alberta provincial electoral districts
Politics of St. Albert, Alberta